Harpy Thyme is a fantasy novel by American writer Piers Anthony, the seventeenth book of the Xanth series.

Plot summary 
Gloha Goblin-Harpy is searching for love, and decides to ask the Magician Humfrey where she can find it. He tells her to ask his second son Crombie the Soldier. Gloha goes on a quest for love, accompanied by Magician Trent and Cynthia, a winged centaur filly.

References

External links

American fantasy novels
 17
1993 American novels
1993 fantasy novels
Hodder & Stoughton books